Thomas Herman Ridgley (October 30, 1925 – August 11, 1999) was an American R&B singer, pianist, songwriter and bandleader in New Orleans, Louisiana. In a musical career lasting half a century Ridgley was a stalwart of the New Orleans rhythm and blues scene.  Although he never had a national hit, unlike several of his contemporaries, he made numerous, popular recordings that sold mainly in New Orleans and Louisiana beginning in 1949 with a final release in 1995. His voice  was variously described as similar to Roy Brown and Bull Moose Jackson and thus able to adapt to a variety of styles: Blues, Jump blues, Rhythm and Blues and Soul. In the late 50s he became bandleader of The Untouchables  with whom he held residencies at important night venues often backing visiting artists.  His recording career consisted of over forty singles and three albums. Most of his recordings have been anthologised on compilations in vinyl and CDs.

Biography

Early life

Tommy Ridgley was born in the Shrewsbury district of New Orleans, the eldest of seventeen brothers and sisters, of which eight survived He had an impoverished upbringing and was a breadwinner for his family before his teens. His social life and that of his family centred on the local church where Ridgley began singing in harmony groups He served with the United States Navy during the Second World War and during his rest-time learnt to play the piano. At demobilization under the terms of the G.I. Bill, that  provided World War II veterans with funds for college education Ridgley studied at the Grunewald School of Music. 
In 1946 he entered a talent contest at the Dew Drop Inn , one of New Orleans premier nightclubs which he won and more significantly gained a profile as an up-coming performer.

Career

Dave Bartholomew Orchestra

Ridgley started his professional career in the late 40's  as  a band singer with a New Orleans Dixieland group and after a brief stint with Earl Anderson's band playing at The Starlight Hotel in Gert Town, he was recruited by trumpeter and band leader Dave Bartholomew. Ridgley, released his debut single, Shrewsbury Blues c/w Early Dawn Boogie in New Orleans in 1949. Produced by Bartholomew  and released on the new imprint Imperial Records the record established Ridgley within New Orleans as a progenitor of jump blues and  blues ballads. A competent songwriter Ridgley wrote both sides of the follow-up I Live My Life c/w Lavinia. In 1952 Lew Chudd, owner of Imperial records selected Ridgley and Bartholomew to cover a song called Looped. It was another New Orleans hit and thereafter a staple of Tommy Ridgley's repertoire.  A Dave Bartholomew Orchestra  single with Ridgley on lead   Tra La La issued on Decca was later covered by Pat Boone. 
Ridgley's singing style in his early career has been compared to that of Roy Brown whilst his reputation as a major New Orleans artist was enhanced by Dave Bartholomew's band that featured outstanding musicians:  drummer Earl Palmer and saxophonists Lee Allen, Herb Hardesty, Red Tyler and Ernest Allen 

In 1953 Ridgley left Bartholomew's band and signed a contract with Atlantic records. He cut I'm Gonna Cross That River c/w Ooh Lawdy My Baby, a record that featured Ray Charles on piano as a member of Edgar Blanchard's Gondoliers  and Jam Up, a sax-led instrumental dance record that narrowly missed the national charts when re-cut in 1961. A regular presence by 1957 on the thriving R&B scene in New Orleans, he was offered a recording contract with Herald Records, by which time Ridgley had formed his own band The Untouchables. Herald released six singles by The Untouchables of which the first release When I Meet My Girl was the most successful. As a marketing ploy Herald used the nickname The New King of The Stroll following the death of the original 'king' Chuck Willis in 1958.
By the end of 1950's Tommy Ridgley and The Untouchables were the resident band at the iconic Dew Drop Inn where they opened for and sometimes backed visiting acts. These included a number of major R&B artists of the late 50's and early 60's: James Brown, Clyde McPhatter, Sam Cooke, Little Willie John and Ivory Joe Hunter . Ridgley also employed a young Irma Thomas as one of his girl singers, later recommending her to Ric Records where she recorded for the subsidiary Ron label.

Joe Ruffino's Ric records 

In 1960, Ridgley also signed with Joe Ruffino's  New Orleans Ric Records, and released seven singles, at six monthly intervals. His third release, a recording of Wynona Carr's Should I Ever Love Again c/w Double-Eyed Whammy was a strong seller in spring 1961, the latter covered by Freddy King in 1966  His fifth release on Ric  In The Same Old Way proved one of the most successful records of his career and he later cut it again on the Shreveport based label Ronn label. However,  Heavenly c/w Honest I Do and I’ve Heard That Story Before, the latter covered by his brother Sammy Ridgley demonstrated that Ridgley could adapt his voice to the new soul music style that was evolving

A one-record deal with the tiny Cinderella label saw No One But You released in the winter of 1963. In February 1964 Cash Box reviewed favourably All My Love Belongs To You c/w I Want Some Money, on the Johen label, a R&B dance record from the pen of Eddie Bo. As the decade progressed Tommy Ridgley continued to gig regularly in New Orleans and Louisiana releasing further one-off soul 45s on small labels: Blue Jay, White Cliffs and Ronn. Ridgley also cut a number of tracks at a studio in Clinton, Mississippi for Bob Robin's International  City imprint including My Love is Getting Stronger, a song that became highly popular on the UK Northern Soul scene in the 1970s and 80s.

During the 1970s and 1980s, there were fewer recording opportunities for Ridgley, however, he intermittently continued to record for a plethora of local New Orleans and Louisiana record labels.These included Sometimes You Get It for Allen Toussaint's Sansu label in 1976  and a remake of Ridgley's own I Can't Make It Any  Longer on  Hep' Me Records, a label owned by Senator Jones. Throughout this period Ridgley continued to perform around New Orleans whilst accepting occasional European dates.The Untouchables  maintained their residency at the Dew Drop Inn until it closed in 1972 and Ridgley  kept performing at the New Orleans Jazz & Heritage Festival every year from 1972 until his death in 1999, a continuous appearance of twenty eight years.

Modern Blues L.P.

In 1992 and nearly fifty years into his music career Ridgley released his first album of new recordings. Appearing on Modern Blues Recordings and titled She Turns Me On it was a varied mix of Jump blues, New Orleans funk and sweet, soulful ballads. It included re-cuts of a number of Ridgley favourites including, I Want Some Money and Jam Up. The Sound of New Orleans label also released an album How Long? during 1992, although the recordings originated from around the turn of the decade.  A final album Since The Blues Began on Black Top Records appeared in 1995. In recognition of his long career in New Orleans he was supported by established musicians that included George Porter Jr., Raymond Weber and guest guitarist Snooks Eaglin all of whom turned out on his last recorded album.

In January 1999 Ridgley received OffBeat magazine's annual Lifetime Achievement Award
Ridgley who suffered from kidney failure in his last few years, died from lung cancer, caused by asbestos inhalation whilst working as a construction worker,  in August 1999.

Discography (L.P.s)
 1992 How Long? (Sound of New Orleans)
 1992 She Turns Me On (Modern Blues Recordings)
 1995 Since The Blues Began (Black Top)

Compilations (selected)
 1977 Through The Years (Sound of New Orleans) (USA)
 1986 Tommy Ridgley: The early 50's in New Orleans (Pathé Marconi) (France)
 1988 The New Orleans King of the Stroll (Rounder) (USA)
 1992 The Herald Recordings (Collectables) (USA)
 2005 Tommy Ridgley 1949-1954 (Classics) (France)
 2015  In The Same Old Way: The Complete Ric, Ron and Sho-Biz Recordings (shared with Bobby Mitchell) (Ace) (UK)
 ''Mardi Gras Jam / Tommy Ridgley & His Orchestra (Blue City) (USA)

Notes

References

External links
Tommy Ridgley official website
[ Biography on Allmusic]
Biography by Marv Goldberg
singles discography

1925 births
1999 deaths
American rhythm and blues musicians
African-American pianists
American soul musicians
Rhythm and blues musicians from New Orleans
Atlantic Records artists
Imperial Records artists
Singers from Louisiana
20th-century African-American male singers
African-American songwriters
Deaths from lung cancer
Deaths from mesothelioma
Deaths from cancer in the United States